Furbaz are a Swiss vocal group consisting of members Marie Louise Werth, Giusep Quinter, Ursin Defuns and Gion Defuns, who perform mainly in the Romansh language.  The group was formed in 1983 in Disentis, Graubünden, remaining active until the early 1990s.  They then reunited in 2004, and continue performing together.  Furbaz are best known internationally for their participation in the Eurovision Song Contest 1989

Eurovision Song Contest 
Furbaz first took part in the Swiss Eurovision selection in 1987, finishing third with "Da cumpignia".  They tried again the following year, coming second (behind Celine Dion) with "Sentiments".  It was third time lucky in 1989, when "Viver senza tei" ("To Live Without You") won a clear victory, going forward to represent Switzerland in the 34th Eurovision Song Contest.  As a result of Celine Dion's Eurovision victory the previous year, the 1989 contest was held on home ground in Lausanne on 6 May, when "Viver senza tei" finished in 13th place of the 22 entries.  The song is the only Eurovision entry to date sung in Romansh.

Current career 
Since re-forming in 2004, Furbaz have specialised in performing Christmas music and are most active at that time of year.  They have recorded three Christmas-themed albums, Nadal, Weihnachten and Messadi da Nadal.

References

External links 
  (German)

Eurovision Song Contest entrants for Switzerland
Eurovision Song Contest entrants of 1989
Swiss pop music groups